Anoplonyx is a genus of insect belonging to the family Tenthredinidae.

The genus was first described by Marlatt in 1896.

Species:
 Anoplonyx destructor

References

Tenthredinidae
Sawfly genera